The Imbabura tree frog (Boana picturata) is a species of frog in the family Hylidae found in the Pacific lowlands of western Colombia (Antioquia, Valle del Cauca, Cauca, and Nariño Departments) and northwestern Ecuador (Imbabura, Esmeraldas, Manabí, Pichincha, Santo Domingo de los Tsáchilas, Los Ríos, and Cotopaxi Provinces) from the sea level to  asl.

Description
Males measure  and females  in snout–vent length. Eyes are extremely large with yellow iris. Snout is truncated. The skin on the back is smooth and belly is slightly granular. Dorsal colouration is variable but generally with a reddish-brown background with round yellow marks. Some individuals have dark brown back with brown markings.

Habitat and conservation
Its natural habitats are humid tropical and premontane forests, including secondary forests with a closed canopy. It lives on vegetation close to streams.

It is an uncommon species. Threats to it likely include habitat loss from agricultural development (including illegal crops, logging, and human settlement) and pollution from spraying illegal crops.

References

Boana
Amphibians of Colombia
Amphibians of Ecuador
Amphibians described in 1882
Taxonomy articles created by Polbot